UNESCO Global Geoparks (UGGp) are geoparks certified by the UNESCO Global Geoparks Council as meeting all the requirements for belonging to the Global Geoparks Network (GGN). The GGN is both a network of geoparks and the agency of the United Nations Educational, Scientific and Cultural Organization (UNESCO). that administers the network.

The agency was founded in 2004 in partnership with the International Union of Geological Sciences (IUGS). The network was set up to conserve Earth's geological heritage, as well as to promote the sustainable research and development by the concerned communities. To implement these goals they adopted the concept of geopark, a term that had already been in use for one of the proposed parks. Geoparks were conceived as
"single, unified geographical areas where sites and landscapes of international geological significance are managed with a holistic concept of protection, education and sustainable development."
As the geopark did not naturally conform to all those requirements, compliance involved considerable work of the country where the geopark was to be located. In essence, the park had to be not only protected, but marketed sustainably to the public. In 2015, the Member States of UNESCO ratified the rebranding to the current name.

Since 2015, the application and designation process has been defined by the Statutes and Operational Guidelines of the UGGp. As of April 2022, there were 177 UGGp's in 46 countries. There are now GGN member sites situated in 5 of 7 continents, there being none currently in either Antarctica or Australasia. There are not yet (2022) global geoparks in the United States. China is the country with the largest number of global geoparks.

Creation of the global network
The Global Geoparks Network (GGN) (also known as the Global Network of National Geoparks) is UNESCO assisted network established in 1998. Managed under the body's Ecological and Earth Sciences Division, the GGN seeks the promotion and conservation of the planet's geological heritage, as well as encourages the sustainable research and development by the concerned communities. Since 2015, its members are officially designated as UNESCO Global Geoparks.

The first batch of members to the GGN were announced during the first International Conference on Geoparks in 2004.

Geopark admission to the global network
The international network seeks the membership  geoparks—geographical areas where geological heritage is the focus of local protection, education and development.

A set of criteria as established by UNESCO must first be met for a geopark, as nominated by the corresponding government, to be included in the GGN:
 the existence of a management plan designed to foster socio-economic development that is sustainable (most likely to be based on agritourism and geotourism);
 demonstrate methods for conserving and enhancing geological heritage and provide means for teaching geoscientific disciplines and broader environmental issues;
 joint-proposals submitted by public authorities, local communities and private interests acting together, which demonstrate the best practices with respect to Earth heritage conservation and its integration into sustainable development strategies. One such initiative is GEOfood, originally developed in Norway but now promoting local produce in global geoparks worldwide.

Criteria satisfaction is evaluated during biennial meetings (every even year) by the Geoparks Committee, known as the International Conference on Geoparks, which is also in charge with the periodic review of projects related to geological awareness. The first members of the GGN were named during the first conference in 2004, and it has continued to grow since then: 

The GGN works closely with another project under UNESCO's Ecological and Earth Sciences Division—the Man and Biosphere (MAB) World Network of Biosphere Reserves—to come up with and establish different means of sustainable development in promoting the local communities’ relationship with the natural environment.

Structure by continent and UNESCO region
The following table contains the detailed articles on the UNESCO Global Geoparks (UGG) and further international recognition frameworks of the geoheritage of each continents and their representative regional geopark networks.

Africa

Asia Pacific

Europe

North America

Latin America and the Caribbean

Continent and UNESCO-Region Notes

Geopark list by country and continent
Many of the names in the list below appear in slightly different forms in different documents or webpages, particularly where they have been anglicised. Dates of accession to network, where not otherwise referenced are taken from UNESCO website.

Note * Kula Volcanic Geopark designated in 2013 was extended and renamed as Kula Salihli in 2020

Geoparks no longer in the GGN
Whilst the length of the list has grown year on year, some members drop out from time to time, either by choice or by failing the network's revalidation procedures.
UNESCO Global Geoparks are given this designation for a period of four years after which the functioning and quality of each UNESCO Global Geopark is thoroughly re-examined during a revalidation process.

Notes

A. Names and spellings used for the elements were based on the official list as published.

References

External links

 UNESCO Global Geoparks on UNESCO site
 GGN official site

 Members